Duke of Moctezuma de Tultengo is a hereditary title of Spanish nobility held by a line of descendants of Emperor Moctezuma II, the ninth Tlatoani, or ruler, of Tenochtitlan. Since 1766, the title has been attached to a Grandeza de España, or a place in the Spanish peerage — the highest honor accorded to Spanish nobility (see also Mexican nobility).

History 

The original title of Count of Moctezuma, from which it descends, was given by King Philip IV of Spain in 1627 to Pedro Tesifón Moctezuma de la Cueva, 1st Viscount of Ilucán, Lord of Tula and Peza, a Knight of Santiago and a great-grandson of Moctezuma II through his son Pedro de Moctezuma Tlacahuepan and grandson Diego Luis Moctezuma (Ihuitl Temoc), Pedro Tesifón Moctezuma de la Cueva's father, who went to Spain. Charles II of Spain later granted the second holder of this title the qualification of de Tultengo, in reference to a town in the Mexican state of Hidalgo which was part of the inheritance of Moctezuma's son Pedro.  All subsequent holders from 1635-1865 used the title, "Count of Moctezuma de Tultengo" until the advancement to the rank of Duke removed de Tultengo. The title of Duke of Moctezuma (without the qualification of 'de Tultengo') was granted to Antonio María Marcilla de Teruel-Moctezuma y Navarro, 14th Count of Moctezuma de Tultengo and 11th Marquis of Tenebrón on October 11, 1865 by Queen Isabella II of Spain.

The current holder of the title is Juan José Marcilla de Teruel-Moctezuma y Valcárcel, 6th Duke of Moctezuma de Tultengo. His father had assumed the title, and was regranted the qualification of de Tultengo (as the second Count of Moctezuma was in 1639) by King Juan Carlos I of Spain in 1992.

List of holders

Family tree

References

Bibliography 

 GONZÁLEZ ACOSTA, Alejandro. “Los herederos de Moctezuma”. Boletín Millares Carlo. ISSN 0211-2140, Nº. 20, 2001. Págs. 151-158.
 ÁLVAREZ NOGAL, Carlos. “El Conde de Moctezuma en el Reino de Granada.” El reino de Granada y el Nuevo Mundo. V Congreso Internacional de Historia de América, mayo de 1992, Vol. 2, 1994. . Págs. 105-116.

 
Dukedoms of Spain
Moctezuma family
Mexican nobility
Titles of nobility in the Americas